The Rotortec Cloud Dancer II is a German autogyro, designed by Jochen Steinbeck and produced by Rotortec of Görisried, Allgäu. The aircraft was first shown at AERO Friedrichshafen in 2009 and is supplied as a complete ready-to-fly-aircraft.

Design and development
The Cloud Dancer II features a single four-bladed main rotor, a two-seats in side-by-side configuration enclosed cockpit, tricycle landing gear with wheel pants and a twin cylinder, air-cooled, four-stroke, turbocharged   Rotortec MPE engine that was developed in-house and is mounted in pusher configuration. It drives a three-bladed composite propeller though a planetary reduction drive.

The aircraft fuselage and the three vertical surface tail are made from aluminum and Kevlar composites. The prototype aircraft mounted a three-bladed main rotor, but this was changed to a four-bladed unit during development. The four-bladed rotor provides improved vibration levels, but at the cost of requiring larger space for storage. An electronic touchscreen instrument panel is standard equipment.

Aircraft on display
Hubschraubermuseum Bückeburg

Specifications (Cloud Dancer II)

References

External links

Official Cloud Dancer II photos

2000s German sport aircraft
Single-engined pusher autogyros